Nicolò Tronci (6 April 1905 – 13 January 1986) was an Italian gymnast. He competed in eight events at the 1936 Summer Olympics.

References

External links
 

1905 births
1986 deaths
Italian male artistic gymnasts
Olympic gymnasts of Italy
Gymnasts at the 1936 Summer Olympics
Place of birth missing